The  is an archaeological site with the ruins of a late Nara period Buddhist temple located in the Oya neighborhood of Suruga-ku of the city of Shizuoka, Japan. The temple no longer exists, but the ruins were designated as a National Historic Site in 1965.

Overview
The Katayama temple site consists of the ruins of a temple complex located about 3.5 kilometers southeast of JR Tōkai Shizuoka Station, and were discovered during highway construction in 1930. The precincts measure approximately 160 meters square. The ruins dates from the late 8th century to the early 10th century (late Nara period to early Heian period). The site was partially excavated in 1948 and again in 1958, during which time the foundations of a Kondō, Kōdō (Lecture Hall) and Rectory were discovered. The Kondō was a 7x4 bay hall, measuring 30.9 meters by 17 meters. The Kōdō was also a 7x4 bay hall, measuring 25,5 meters by 15.8 meters. The rectory had 23 cells, with an estimated length of between 68.2 and width of between 9.1 and 10.9 meters.  

From the layout of the ruins and its large size, a theory was advanced that this was the site of the lost kokubun-ji of Suruga Province, although due to the lack of a pagoda, a theory was also advanced that the temple was the private monastery of a great landholder in ancient Udo Country. The discovery of the foundations of a pagoda in 2009 further reinforced the possibility that the ruin is that of a kokubun-ji. 

A large refuse pile was discovered approximately 500 meters south of the temple ruins which was found to contain a large number of roof tiles from the abandoned temple. In addition, tile shards at the Miyagawa kiln ruins, approximately one kilometer to the south of the Katayama temple site correspond to the same tiles as were found at this refuse pile. The Miyagawa kiln ruins contain two noborigama kilns and one flat kiln. The kiln site and the refuse pile were both added to the National Historic Site designation in 1974. 

The temple appears to have been destroyed by a fire at some unknown time. The preservation of the site is poor, as it is located underneath an overpass of the Tōmei Expressway and a prefectural road cuts through the ruins.

Gallery

See also
List of Historic Sites of Japan (Shizuoka)

References

External links

Shizuoka City site 

Historic Sites of Japan
Shizuoka (city)
Suruga Province
8th-century establishments in Japan
Nara period
Buddhist archaeological sites in Japan